A Small Circle of Friends is a 1980 American drama film directed by Rob Cohen (in his directing debut) and starring Brad Davis, Karen Allen and Jameson Parker. It was distributed by United Artists.

Premise 
The film follows the life of three students (Davis, Allen, Parker) at Harvard University and Radcliffe College in the 1960s.

Cast
 Brad Davis as Leonardo DaVinci Rizzo
 Karen Allen as Jessica Bloom
 Jameson Parker as Nick Baxter
 Shelley Long as Alice
 John Friedrich as Alex Haddox
 Gary Springer as Greenblatt
 Craig Richard Nelson as Harry Norris
 Harry Caesar as Jimmy
 Nan Martin as Mrs. Baxter
 Daniel Stern as Crazy Kid

Soundtrack 
The soundtrack features instrumental music composed by Jim Steinman. Steinman later incorporated melodies from his score into the power ballad songs "Total Eclipse of the Heart", which became a number one hit for Bonnie Tyler in 1983, and "Making Love Out of Nothing at All", which simultaneously became a number two hit for Air Supply.

Production 
Other scenes were filmed at  MIT and other local colleges.

References

External links
 
 
 Karen Allen: An ACME Page

1980 directorial debut films
1980 drama films
1980 films
1980s American films
1980s English-language films
American drama films
Films about threesomes
Films directed by Rob Cohen
Films produced by Tim Zinnemann
Films set in Harvard University
Films set in Massachusetts
Films set in the 1960s
Films shot in Massachusetts
United Artists films